The United States Attorney General's List of Subversive Organizations (AGLOSO) was a list drawn up on April 3, 1947 at the request of the United States Attorney General (and later Supreme Court justice) Tom C. Clark. The list was intended to be a compilation of organizations seen as "subversive" by the United States government. Among those were: Communist fronts, the Ku Klux Klan and the Nazi Party.

History

Creation
The Attorney General's list was first known as the Biddle list after President Franklin D. Roosevelt's Attorney General Francis Biddle began tracking Soviet controlled subversive front organizations in 1941.  The original list had only eleven organizations but was greatly expanded by the end of the decade to upwards of 90 organizations.  It did not list individuals.

Communist groups, which emerged both in the pre-war and the post-war list, are marked by one ". In the meantime, even some trade unions that excluded members of openly communist groups from their membership lists were dissolved, partially also by government resolution.

Thousands of Americans with progressive or radical political beliefs signed petitions for, or became members of, these groups without being aware of the Communist ties of the group.  Many were later persecuted and suffered personal consequences during the McCarthy era.  Some others,  though, were found through HUAC investigations and Venona cable intercepts, to be actively involved in Soviet sponsored espionage and related activities.

Biddle list

AGLOSO of 4 December 1947
On December 4, 1947, US Attorney General Tom C. Clark released the "Attorney General's List of Subversive Organizations" (AGLOSO).

As reported by the New York Times on the same day, the list included groups from the Biddle List plus new groups plus eleven (11) school.  Leaders of five groups—the Reverend William H. Melish of the National Council of American-Soviet Friendship, Martic Martntz of the Armenian Progressive League of America, Howard Selsam of the Jefferson School of Social Science, Max Yergan of the Council on African Affairs, and Edward Barsky of the Joint Anti-Fascist Refugee Committee—denied the government's accusation.

The next day, the New York Times reported a second batch of groups who rejected the government's accusation:  William Z. Foster and Eugene Dennis of the Communist Party USA, an unnamed spokesperson for the International Workers Order, an unnamed spokesperson for the Civil Rights Congress, an unnamed spokesperson for American Youth for Democracy, Harrison L. Harley of the Samuel Adams School for Social Studies, and Walter Scott Neff of the Abraham Lincoln School.

Later history
The Attorney General's List of Subversive Organizations (AGLOSO) was expanded by President Harry S. Truman's Executive Order 9835. EO 9835 established the first Federal Employee Loyalty Program designed to root out Communist infiltration of the U.S. government. It allowed for organizations to be listed on the recommendation of certain members of the House Un-American Activities Committee (HUAC) members, as designated by committee Chairman J. Parnell Thomas. Those he named initially were John McDowell, a Pennsylvania Republican, Richard Vail, an Illinois Republican, and John Wood, a Georgia Democrat. They readied their first version of the list for Attorney General Tom C. Clark within a few days. It appeared in the Federal Register on March 20, 1948.

Executive Order 10450, issued by President Dwight D. Eisenhower in April 1953, expanded the Attorney General's List and added the proviso that members of the United States armed forces could not join or associate with any group on the list under threat of discharge from military service.

List as of 1959
 Abraham Lincoln Brigade April 29, 1953
 Abraham Lincoln School April 29, 1953
 Action Committee to Free Spain Now April 29, 1953
 Alabama People's Educational Association April 29, 1953
 American Association for Reconstruction in Yugoslavia April 29, 1953
 American Christian Nationalist Party April 29, 1953
 American Committee for European Worker's Relief April 29, 1953
 American Committee for Protection of Foreign Born April 29, 1953
 American Committee for the Settlement of Jews in Birobidzhan Inc September 28, 1953
 American Committee for Yugoslav Relief, Inc. April 29, 1953
 American Committee To Survey Labor Conditions in Europe July 15, 1953
 American Council for a Democratic Greece (formerly known as the Greek American Council; Greek American Committee for National Unity), April 29, 1953 
 American Peace Crusade
 American Polish League
 Black Dragon Society
 Cervantes Fraternal Society
 Committee to Abolish Discrimination in Maryland
 Committee to Aid the Fighting South
 Committee to Defend the Rights and Freedom of Pittsburgh's Political Prisoners
 Committee for a Democratic Far Eastern Policy
 Committee for Constitutional and Political Freedom
 Committee for the Defense of the Pittsburgh Six
 Committee for Nationalist Action
 Committee for the Negro in the Arts
 Committee for Peace and Brotherhood Festival in Philadelphia
 Committee for the Protection of the Bill of Rights
 Committee for World Youth Friendship and Cultural Exchange
 Committee to Defend Marie Richardson
 Committee to Uphold the Bill of Rights
 Congress of African Women
 Dai Nippon Butoku Kai
 Daily Worker Press Club
 Detroit Youth Assembly
 Elsinore Progressive League
 Families of the Baltimore Smith Act Victims
 Federation of Greek Maritime Unions
 Florida Press and Education League
 Freedom Stage, Inc.
 Friends of the Soviet Union
 Garibaldi American Fraternal Society
 German American Bund
 Harlem Trade Union Council
 Hellenic-American Brotherhood
 Hungarian Brotherhood
 Independent Socialist League
 Industrial Workers of the World
 Japanese Association of America
 Jeanette Rankin Brigade
 Jewish Community of Cortlandt
 Jewish Culture Society
 Jewish People's Committee
 Johnsonites
 Knights of the White Camelia
 Ku Klux Klan
 Labor Youth League
 League of American Writers
 Mario Morgantini Circle
 Michigan Council for Peace 
 Michigan School of Social Science
 Nanka Teikoku Gunyudan
 National Negro Congress
 Nationalist Action League
 Oklahoma League for Political Education
 Peace Information Center
 Peace Movement of Ethiopia
 People's Educational and Press Association of Texas
 People's Rights Party
 Revolutionary Workers League
 Russian American Society
 Silver Shirt Legion of America
 Veterans of the Abraham Lincoln Brigade
 Virginia League for People's Education
 Youth Communist League

Abolition
The list went through several revisions until President Richard M. Nixon abolished it in 1974.

Impact
The list's impact was immediate but not all important. Its purpose was to provide a guide for the loyalty boards mandated by EO 9835. The Federal Bureau of Investigation (FBI) began using it immediately, but it was only one of many lists they used. The HUAC maintained its own list. Membership in an organization on any such list was reported to the Justice Department and loyalty boards.

See also

 English-language press of the Communist Party USA
 Non-English press of the Communist Party USA
 List of members of the House Un-American Activities Committee

Footnotes

1947 in the United States
Anti-communism in the United States
Industrial Workers of the World in the United States
McCarthyism
Political repression in the United States
1947 in American law
1947 documents